Ritual is a 2013 American horror film written and directed by Mickey Keating.  It stars Lisa Summerscales and Dean Cates as a married couple who must deal with a murderous cult.  It was released in the United States on December 31, 2013.

Plot 
Tom Moses' estranged wife, Lovely, kills a man who tried to kidnap her and calls him for help. Finding a video of a cult sacrifice in the dead man's car, Tom realizes he and his wife are in danger.

Cast 
 Lisa Summerscales as Lovely
 Dean Cates as Tom
 Brian Lally as Roman
 Derek Phillips as The Man
 Larry Fessenden as Motel Clerk

Release 
Lionsgate Home Entertainment released it in the United States on December 31, 2013.

Reception 
Samuel Zimmerman of Fangoria rated it 3/4 stars and wrote, "Being a brisk film, Ritual is one half intimate, indie motel dilemma/one half violent pursuit, punctuated by stark oddities in aesthetic and sound design throughout."  Patrick Cooper of Bloody Disgusting rated it 2/5 stars and, though he complimented the score and acting, said the film comes off as "an uninspired attempt at tapping into David Lynch's style".  In comparing it negatively to Vacancy, Rohit Rao of DVD Talk rated it 2/5 stars and called it "an odd little thriller that hardly ever thrills".

References

External links 
 
 

2013 films
2013 horror films
2013 horror thriller films
Films about cults
American independent films
American horror thriller films
Religious horror films
2013 independent films
2010s English-language films
2010s American films